ISO/IEC 14651:2016, Information technology -- International string ordering and comparison -- Method for comparing character strings and description of the common template tailorable ordering, is an ISO/IEC standard specifying an algorithm that can be used when comparing two strings. This comparison can be used when collating a set of strings. The standard also specifies a datafile specifying the comparison order, the Common Tailorable Template, CTT. The comparison order is supposed to be tailored for different languages (hence the CTT is regarded as a template and not a default, though the empty tailoring, not changing any weighting, is appropriate in many cases), since different languages have incompatible ordering requirements. One such tailoring is European ordering rules (EOR), which in turn is supposed to be tailored for different European languages.

The Common Tailorable Template (CTT) datafile of this ISO/IEC standard is aligned with the Default Unicode Collation Entity Table (DUCET) datafile of the Unicode collation algorithm (UCA) specified in Unicode Technical Standard #10.

This is the fourth edition of the standard and was published on 2016-02-15, corrected on 2016-05-01 and covers up to and including Unicode 8.0. One additional amendment Amd.1:2017 was published in September 2017 and covers up to and including Unicode 9.0.

See also
Collation
European ordering rules
ISO/IEC JTC 1/SC 2
Unicode

External links and references
ISO site, "ISO/IEC 14651:2016". ISO/IEC 14651:2016 and Amd.1:2017 are freely available from the ISO website 
"What are the differences between the UCA and ISO 14651?"

String collation algorithms
14651
Unicode algorithms
Collation